Robert Jeffrey Alkire (born  November 15, 1969) is an American former professional baseball pitcher who played internationally for Team USA.

Alkire attended the University of Miami, where he played college baseball for the Miami Hurricanes. In 1991, he played collegiate summer baseball for the Hyannis Mets of the Cape Cod Baseball League. He pitched for the United States national baseball team in the 1992 Summer Olympics.

After his baseball career, he started his own business and worked as a sales representative for Elkay Manufacturing.

References

External links

Living people
Baseball players at the 1992 Summer Olympics
Olympic baseball players of the United States
Baseball pitchers
Miami Hurricanes baseball players
Hyannis Harbor Hawks players
1969 births